Ansarada Group Limited (Ansarada) is an Australian publicly listed company (ASX:AND) that develops products used worldwide by companies, advisors and governments to maintain their most crucial information and processes in deals and transaction management, board management, compliance and procurement. Ansarada intends to allow organizations to be run more efficiently, with reduced risk and an increased ability to make fast confident decisions. Over $1 trillion in deal value has been transacted on the Ansarada platform.

Ansarada has main offices in Sydney, London, Amsterdam, Chicago, Ho Chi Minh City and Johannesburg.

Overview
Sydney-based Ansarada was founded in 2005 by Andrew Slavin (chief technology officer), Sam Riley (chief executive officer), Rachel Riley (chief financial officer) and Daphne Chang. The company is named after the first two letters of the founder's first names. Historically, Ansarada's virtual data rooms have enabled the hosting, exchange and management of confidential material information between bidders and sellers during the M&A (mergers and acquisitions) due diligence process through the Software as a Service (SaaS) solutions.

In January 2014, the company launched its first M&A video game.

In July 2016, Ansarada partnered with PYCO Group and launched a new software development center in Vietnam.

Structure 
Ansarada employs about 200 people and has offices in Sydney, Chicago, New York City, London, Amsterdam, Frankfurt, Johannesburg, and Hong Kong, with a development centre in Ho Chi Minh City.

The four founders and some employees own about 80 percent of the company with a group of investment bankers and lawyers who own 20 percent.

AI-Powered Virtual Data Rooms 
Ansarada Virtual Data Rooms (VDR), presented in 2017, is for letting users to know, raise and realize their potential.

AI Bidder Engagement Scoring 
Sell-side users of Ansarada Rooms can view an AI Bidder Engagement Score that assigns a numerical value to the likelihood that each potential bidder will make an offer. It predicts who will win and tells sellers who is interested. The AI Bidder Engagement Score is calculated using a machine learning algorithm that takes into account the performance of 57 separate metrics over time.

AiDA 
AiDA, an acronym for Ansarada Intelligent Data Assistant, extracts on-demand insights and data based on activity within an Ansarada Room. Users interact with AiDA through a chat interface available for iPhone through the iTunes App Store. The virtual assistant uses Natural Language Processing to understand user requests.

RaaS and the Material Information Platform 
In October 2017, Ansarada launched the world's first Material Information Platform to deliver Readiness as a Service (RaaS) The platform uses technologies in artificial intelligence and machine learning to help businesses be ready for their most important outcomes by structuring their material information correctly, assigning accountability to people and tracking progress with an objective score of readiness.

M&A game
Ansarada launched an M&A game in January 2014 to appeal primarily to investment bankers in a risk-free setting, The New York Times reported.

References

External links

Mergers and acquisitions
Companies based in Sydney
Technology companies of Australia
File sharing
Cloud applications
Document management systems
Collaborative software